Desert rock may refer to

Music
 Palm Desert Scene, a Californian music culture that has been described as "desert rock"
 North African and Saharan desert blues or desert rock music
 Desert Rock, a musical project formed by British blues rock guitarist Ramon Goose
 Dubai Desert Rock Festival, an event celebrating various styles of rock and metal music on one stage in Dubai, United Arab Emirates

Other uses
 Desert Rock exercises, a series of exercises conducted by the U.S. military in conjunction with atmospheric nuclear tests
 Camp Desert Rock, a former staging base for troops participating in the Desert Rock exercises
 Desert Rock Airport, a private-use airport located near the central business district of Mercury, in Nye County, Nevada, United States
 Mt. Desert Rock, an island of Maine home to the Mount Desert Light lighthouse

See also
 Desert § Physical geography